Salt of the earth is a phrase used by Jesus, according to the New Testament. It may refer to:

Literature
 A metaphor that occurs in the Sermon on the Mount, part of a discourse on salt and light
 Salt of the Earth, a book by Pope Benedict XVI

Film
 Salt of the Earth (1954 film), an American drama
 Salt of the Earth: Palestinian Christians in the Northern West Bank, a 2004 documentary short series 
 The Salt of the Earth (2014 film), a documentary

Music
 "Salt of the Earth" (song), a track on The Rolling Stones' 1968 album Beggars Banquet
 Salt of the Earth (The Soul Searchers album), a 1974 album
 Salt of the Earth (Ricky Skaggs & The Whites album), a 2007 album
 Salt of the Earth (EP), a 2008 EP by Texas in July

Other uses
 Salt of the Earth Strike (1950–52), American miners' strike better known as the Empire Zinc strike

See also
 Salting the earth